Aleksandra Szczudło (born 22 September 1983) is a Polish politician. She was elected to the Sejm (9th term) representing the constituency of Białystok.

References 

Living people
1983 births
Place of birth missing (living people)
21st-century Polish politicians
21st-century Polish women politicians
Members of the Polish Sejm 2019–2023
Women members of the Sejm of the Republic of Poland